Daler Adyamovich Kuzyayev (born 15 January 1993) is a Russian professional footballer who plays for Zenit Saint Petersburg and the Russian national team. He mostly plays as a central midfielder or a right midfielder. He is of Tatar descent.

Club career

He made his debut in the Russian Second Division for FC Karelia Petrozavodsk on 23 July 2012 in a game against FC Spartak Kostroma.

He made his debut in the Russian Premier League for FC Terek Grozny on 15 May 2014 in a game against FC Rubin Kazan.

On 14 June 2017, he signed a 3-year contract with FC Zenit Saint Petersburg. On his Zenit debut on 16 July 2017, he scored the first goal of his professional career, opening scoring in a game against FC SKA-Khabarovsk 7 minutes after coming into the game as a half-time substitute.

His contract expired at the end of the 2019–20 season and he became a free agent and wanted to play abroad. After missing the 2020 Russian Super Cup and the first 10 games of the 2020–21 Russian Premier League, on 6 October 2020 he returned to Zenit and signed a new three-year contract.

International career
He made his debut for Russia national football team on 7 October 2017 in a friendly game against South Korea.

On 11 May 2018, he was included in Russia's extended 2018 FIFA World Cup squad. On 3 June 2018, he was included in the finalized World Cup squad. He appeared as a second-half substitute in every group stage game, before starting both knock-out stage games - the Round of 16 defeat of Spain and the quarterfinal shoot-out loss to Croatia.

He scored his first national team goal on 19 November 2019 in a Euro 2020 qualifier against San Marino.

On 11 May 2021, he was included in the preliminary extended 30-man squad for UEFA Euro 2020. On 2 June 2021, he was included in the final squad. He started Russia's opening game against Belgium on 12 June 2021, but had to be substituted after colliding head-to-head with Timothy Castagne after 25 minutes of play (Castagne suffered double eye socket fracture in the collision and left the Euro 2020 due to that). He recovered for the second game against Finland on 16 June and played a full game in 1–0 victory. He started again on 21 June in the last group game against Denmark as Russia lost 1–4 and was eliminated, as Kuzyayev was substituted halfway through the second half.

Honours
Zenit Saint Petersburg
Russian Premier League: 2018–19, 2019–20, 2020–21, 2021–22
Russian Cup: 2019–20
Russian Super Cup: 2021, 2022

Career statistics

Club

International
Statistics accurate as of match played 24 September 2021.

International goals
Scores and results Russia's goal tally first.

Personal life
His older brother Ruslan Kuzyayev is a footballer, his father Adyam Kuzyayev is a coach and former player. His grandfather Kabir Kuzyayev played in the Soviet First League for FC Pamir Dushanbe in the 1960s.

References

External links

1993 births
People from Naberezhnye Chelny
Living people
Russian footballers
Association football midfielders
FC Neftekhimik Nizhnekamsk players
FC Akhmat Grozny players
FC Zenit Saint Petersburg players
Russian Premier League players
Russian First League players
Russian Second League players
Russia international footballers
2018 FIFA World Cup players
UEFA Euro 2020 players
Russian people of Tajikistani descent
Tatar people of Russia
Tatar sportspeople
Sportspeople from Tatarstan